The 2019–20 Singapore Tri-Nation Series was a cricket tournament that was held from 27 September to 3 October 2019 in Singapore. It was a tri-nation series featuring Singapore, Nepal and Zimbabwe, with all the matches played as Twenty20 Internationals (T20Is). Singapore used the series as preparation for their first appearance in the ICC T20 World Cup Qualifier in October 2019. It was the first T20I tri-series to be played in Singapore.

Prior to the series, Zimbabwe also played in another tri-series, in Bangladesh. Zimbabwe Cricket named Sean Williams as Zimbabwe's captain, after Hamilton Masakadza announced that he would retire from international cricket following the conclusion of the tri-series in Bangladesh that took place earlier in September.

In the third match of the series, Singapore beat Zimbabwe by four runs. It was the first time that Singapore had beaten a Full Member team in an international cricket match. Despite their loss to Singapore, Zimbabwe went on to win the series, winning all their other matches.

Squads

Points table

Matches

1st T20I

2nd T20I

3rd T20I

4th T20I

5th T20I

6th T20I

Notes

References

External links
 Series home at ESPN Cricinfo

Tri-Nation Series
2019 in Nepalese cricket
2019 in Zimbabwean cricket
International cricket competitions in 2019–20
International cricket competitions in Singapore
Singapore Tri-Nation Series
Singapore Tri-Nations Series